Rucayo is a hamlet located in the municipality of Boñar, in León province, Castile and León, Spain. As of 2020, it has a population of 33.

Geography 
Rucayo is located 65km north-northeast of León, Spain.

References

Populated places in the Province of León